The Oxapampa Province is the largest of three provinces that make up the Pasco Region in Peru. The capital of the Oxapampa province is the city of Oxapampa. The province is located on the eastern slopes of the Andes reaching down to the lowlands of the Amazon Basin.

The Cerro de la Sal, an important source of salt for the indigenous people of the Amazon Basin since pre-historic times is located in the Villa Rica District of the province. The southeastern part of the province is the location of the Gran Pajonal (Great Grassland), an elevated plateau occupied by the Asháninka people.

Oxapampa is best known for the colonists from Austria and Germany who established one of the first European settlements (in Peru) east of the Andes in remote Pozuzo District in 1859 and founded the towns of Oxapampa in 1891 and Villa Rica in 1928. German influence remain in the architecture and culture of these districts.

Political divisions
The Oxapampa Province is divided into eight districts, each of which is headed by a mayor (alcalde):

Places of interest 
 
 Cerro de la Sal 
 El Sira Communal Reserve
 Gran Pajonal 
 San Matías–San Carlos Protection Forest
 Yanachaga–Chemillén National Park
 Yanesha Communal Reserve

References

External links
 Official web site of the Oxapampa Province
 Pozuzo Information

Provinces of the Pasco Region